French butter may refer to:

Beurre d'Isigny, produced in the Veys Bay area
Beurre Charentes-Poitou, which also includes Beurre des Charentes and Beurre des Deux-Sèvres, under the same classification.